Staten Island Summer is a 2015 American comedy film directed by Rhys Thomas and written by Colin Jost. The film stars Graham Phillips, Zack Pearlman, John DeLuca, Bobby Moynihan, Will Forte, Fred Armisen, Cecily Strong, Owen Benjamin and Ashley Greene. It was released for digital download on June 30, 2015, by Paramount Pictures.

Plot

The film follows Danny and Frank's last summer together before college. They are both working as lifeguards and trying to find summer hook ups. With a troubling setback they still manage to throw an end-of-the-summer party.

Cast
 Graham Phillips as Danny Campbell
 Zack Pearlman as Frank Gomes
 John DeLuca as Anthony 
 Bobby Moynihan as Skootch
 Mike O'Brien as Chuck
 Will Forte as Griffith
 Fred Armisen as Victor
 Cecily Strong as Mary Ellen
 Ashley Greene as Krystal Manicucci
 Owen Benjamin as Health Inspector
 Vincent Pastore as Leo Manicucci
 Kate Walsh as Mrs. Campbell		
 Gina Gershon as Ms. Greeley
 Colin Jost as Officer Callahan
 Jim Gaffigan as Mr. Campbell
 Method Man as Konko
 Mary Birdsong as Bianca Manicucci
 Jackson Nicoll as Wendell
 Kate McKinnon as Mrs. Bandini Jr.
 Penny Marshall as Swim Club Worker

Production
On August 28, 2013, John DeLuca joined the cast. On September 18, 2013, Gina Gershon joined the cast. Principal photography began in August 2013.

Release
The film was released for digital download on June 30, 2015. The film was released on July 31, 2015, on Netflix.

References

External links
 
 

2015 films
2015 comedy films
American comedy films
Films scored by John Swihart
Films set in Staten Island
Films shot in New York City
Paramount Pictures films
2010s English-language films
2010s American films